Platys Gialos or Platis Yalós: 

 Platys Gialos, Mykonos, a village in Mykonos, Greece
 A village in Sifnos, Greece